McConville Peak is a summit in the U.S. state of Oregon.

McConville Peak was named in 1889 after one Arthur McConville.

References

Mountains of Jackson County, Oregon
Mountains of Oregon